Albert Gelis Juanola (born 26 October 1981) is a vision-impaired S12 swimmer from Spain.

Personal 
Gelis was born on 26 October 1981 in Sant Joan les Fonts, Girona. He is from the Catalan region of Spain.

Swimming 
Gelis is a vision impaired S12 swimmer. He competed  at the 2004 Summer Paralympics, 2008 Summer Paralympics and 2012 Summer Paralympics. He earned a silver medal at the 2004 Games in the 4 x 100 meter 49 Points Medley Relay. In 2007, he competed at the IDM German Open.  From the Catalan region of Spain, he was a recipient of a 2012 Plan ADO scholarship. Prior to heading to London for the 2012 Games, he participated in a national vision impaired swim team training camp at the High Performance Centre of Sant Cugat from 6 to 23 August.  Daily at the camp, there were two in water training sessions and one out of water training session.

References

External links 
 
 

1981 births
Living people
Spanish male backstroke swimmers
Spanish male butterfly swimmers
Paralympic swimmers of Spain
Paralympic swimmers with a vision impairment
Paralympic silver medalists for Spain
Paralympic bronze medalists for Spain
Paralympic medalists in swimming
Swimmers at the 2008 Summer Paralympics
Swimmers at the 2004 Summer Paralympics
Swimmers at the 2012 Summer Paralympics
Medalists at the 2004 Summer Paralympics
Medalists at the World Para Swimming European Championships
Plan ADOP alumni
Swimmers from Catalonia
People from Garrotxa
Sportspeople from the Province of Girona
S12-classified Paralympic swimmers
Spanish blind people